Persatuan Sepak Bola Langsa, commonly known as PSBL Langsa, is an  Indonesian football club based in Langsa, Aceh. They play in Liga 3. Their home ground is Langsa Stadium. In the 2021 Liga 3 Aceh season, PSBL Langsa came out as champions after defeating Galacticos Bireuen, this is their fourth title in the club's history. They got their first title in 1983 after winning the match against PSLS Lhokseumawe, the second title was when in 1993, they managed to win the match 3–2 over PSAP Sigli, and the third title in 1999, they managed to beat Persimura Mutiara.

Squad

Honours
 Liga 3 Aceh
 Champions (1): 2021–22
 Runner-up (1): 2019
'''Liga 3 Nasional
 Round of 32 (1): 2021-22

References

External links
PSBL Langsa at Liga-Indonesia.co.id

Football clubs in Indonesia
Football clubs in Aceh
1966 establishments in Indonesia
Association football clubs established in 1966